The  is an electric multiple unit (EMU) train type operated by the private railway operator Keikyu on commuter services in the Tokyo area of Japan. First introduced in 1994, a total of eight 8-car sets and six 4-car sets were built by Tokyu Car Corporation and Kawasaki Heavy Industries to replace the ageing 1000 series sets on limited express services.

Operations 
The 600 series is primarily operated on the Keikyu Main Line. They are also used on inter-running services to the Toei Asakusa Line, Keisei Main Line, Hokuso Line, and the Narita Sky Access Line. Four-car sets are occasionally used on the Keikyu Daishi Line.

Formations
, the fleet consists of eight 8-car sets and six 4-car sets (classified 650 series).

8-car sets
The eight-car sets 601 to 607 are formed as follows, with six motored (M) cars and two trailer (T) cars.

 The "x" in the car numbers corresponds to the set number.
 The "M1c" and "M1" cars are each fitted with one lozenge-type pantograph, and the "M1'" car is fitted with two pantographs.

The eight-car set 608 is formed as follows, with four motored (M) cars and four trailer (T) cars.

The two "Tp1" cars are each fitted with two single-arm pantographs.

4-car sets
The four-car sets are formed as follows, with two motored (M) cars and two trailer (T) cars.

The "Tp2" car is fitted with two single-arm pantographs.

Interior 
The first batch of sets introduced featured transverse seating bays throughout. While most of the seating was fixed, some seats were partially retractable. Later sets featured longitudinal seating. From 2004, the earlier sets were modified with some transverse seating bays replaced by longitudinal seats.

Liveries
Set 606 received a special "Blue Sky Train" livery in March 2005 to commemorate the opening of Haneda Airport Terminal 2.

Refurbishment
The 600 series underwent refurbishment from August 2009 to March 2014. Modifications included were replacing the wiper cover with a slit of the model number (similar to those found on the 2100 series and N1000 series), a narrower skirt, LED side lights, and a pair of LCD information screens above the doorways.

References

External links

 Keikyu 600 series official information 

Electric multiple units of Japan
600 series
Train-related introductions in 1994
Kawasaki multiple units
Tokyu Car multiple units
1500 V DC multiple units of Japan